is a retired long-distance runner from Japan, who finished second in the 1981 edition of the Fukuoka Marathon on December 6, 1981.

International competitions

Marathons

References
 1981 Year List

1955 births
Living people
Sportspeople from Nagano Prefecture
Japanese male long-distance runners
Japanese male marathon runners
World Athletics Championships athletes for Japan
Asian Athletics Championships winners
Japan Championships in Athletics winners
20th-century Japanese people